Wei Yili (born 24 June 1982) is a former badminton player from China.

Career 
A women's doubles specialist, since 2001 Wei has competed on the world circuit in partnership with a variety of her fellow countrywomen, but most often with Zhang Jiewen, Zhao Tingting or Zhang Yawen. A member of China's perennial world champion Uber Cup teams, in the biggest events for individual players (such as the BWF World Championships, the All-England Championships, and the Olympic Games) Wei and her partners have usually been overshadowed by China's two dominant women's doubles pairs, Gao Ling and Huang Sui, and Yang Wei and Zhang Jiewen. One exception came at the 2007 All-Englands where Wei Yili and Zhang Yawen defeated both of these teams to capture the highly coveted title. Her other women's doubles titles include the China (2001), Singapore (2001, 2007), Denmark (2002, 2004), Thailand (2003), Indonesia (2006), and French (2007) Opens.

Wei has medaled four times at the BWF World Championships without "striking gold". She earned a silver  with Zhang Jiewen in 2001, a silver with Zhao Tingting in 2003, a silver with Zhang Yawen in 2006, and a bronze with Zhang Yawen in 2007. She finished fourth at the 2004 Olympics in Athens with Zhao Tingting. At the 2008 Beijing Olympics Wei and Zhang Yawen were beaten in the semifinals by yet another Chinese pair, Du Jing and Yu Yang, who went on to win the gold medal. Wei and Zhang earned a bronze medal by defeating Japan's Miyuki Maeda and Satoko Suetsuna in the playoff for third place.

In 2008, Wei retired from the national team. She  received an award during a ceremony to mark her retirement with five other teammates from the Chinese national badminton team on the sidelines of the China Open badminton event in Shanghai, November 23, 2008. However, she was still playing a year later by partnering with Gao Ling. They lost to Yang Wei and Zhang Jiewen in the Thailand Open final of 2009, but won the Philippines Open of 2009.

Achievements

Olympic Games 
Women's doubles

BWF World Championships 
Women's doubles

World Cup 
Women's doubles

Asian Championships 
Women's doubles

World Junior Championships 
Girls' doubles

Mixed doubles

Asian Junior Championships 
Girls' doubles

Mixed doubles

BWF Superseries 
The BWF Superseries, which was launched on 14 December 2006 and implemented in 2007, is a series of elite badminton tournaments, sanctioned by the Badminton World Federation (BWF). BWF Superseries levels are Superseries and Superseries Premier. A season of Superseries consists of twelve tournaments around the world that have been introduced since 2011. Successful players are invited to the Superseries Finals, which are held at the end of each year.

Women's doubles

  BWF Superseries Finals tournament
  BWF Superseries Premier tournament
  BWF Superseries tournament

BWF Grand Prix 
The BWF Grand Prix had two levels, the BWF Grand Prix and Grand Prix Gold. It was a series of badminton tournaments sanctioned by the Badminton World Federation (BWF) which was held from 2007 to 2017. The World Badminton Grand Prix has been sanctioned by the International Badminton Federation from 1983 to 2006.

Women's doubles

  BWF Grand Prix Gold tournament
  BWF & IBF Grand Prix tournament

IBF International 
Women's doubles

References

External links 
 
 

1982 births
Living people
People from Yichang
Badminton players from Hubei
Chinese female badminton players
Badminton players at the 2004 Summer Olympics
Badminton players at the 2008 Summer Olympics
Olympic badminton players of China
Olympic bronze medalists for China
Olympic medalists in badminton
Medalists at the 2008 Summer Olympics
Badminton players at the 2002 Asian Games
Asian Games gold medalists for China
Asian Games medalists in badminton
Medalists at the 2002 Asian Games